Akimitsu (written: 右光, 彬光, 昭光 or 顕光) is a masculine Japanese given name. Notable people with the name include:

, Japanese noble
, Japanese samurai
, Japanese writer
, Japanese voice actor

Japanese masculine given names